I Swear...  is the second studio album by American metalcore band Inhale Exhale.  It was released on June 10, 2008 through Solid State Records. The booklet that comes with the CD has the lyrics written in code. A key to the code is located inside the jewel case behind the CD.

Track listing
 I Needed A Space Ship (Instead I Got Problems) - 3:34
 It's Myself Vs. Being A Man - 4:55
 The Impatient Will Suffer - 4:40
 Is The Fact That I'm Trying To Do It, Doing It For You? - 3:26
 I Live The Bad Life (You Make It Worse) - 3:46
 No One Is Invincible - 4:34
 The Words That We Have Chosen - 3:38
 Drink Till We Drop - 3:19
 I'll Die With No Friends And A Grin On My Face - 4:00
 Fluvanna - 4:07
 Knowledge = Priceless - 4:18

Personnel
 Ryland Raus - lead vocals, keys
 John LaRussa - lead guitar
 Chris "Gator" Carroll - drums, percussion
 Jeremy Gifford - bass
 Travis Wyrick - production

References

2008 albums
Inhale Exhale albums
Solid State Records albums
Albums produced by Travis Wyrick